Ričardas Berankis was the defending champion but chose not to defend his title.

Yannick Hanfmann won the title after defeating Roberto Cid Subervi 7–6(7–3), 4–6, 6–2 in the final.

Seeds

Draw

Finals

Top half

Bottom half

External links
Main Draw
Qualifying Draw

Shymkent Challenger - Singles
2018 Singles